This is a list of World War I flying aces who were born in the territory of the present-day Republic of Poland. Poland was not an independent country during World War I, and pilots born there served in several different air forces. They may therefore also appear in other lists of aces. Some of them also fought in the struggles that echoed through Europe in the aftermath of World War I.

This list is incomplete.

References
Notes

Bibliography
 

Poland
 
World War I flying aces